Merlin the Magic Mouse is an animated cartoon mouse, who starred in five Warner Bros. Looney Tunes shorts late in the series, from 1967 to 1969. The first cartoon was Merlin the Magic Mouse, directed by Alex Lovy.

In 1967, Jack L. Warner reorganized the Warner Bros. animation department, and hired Lovy away from Hanna-Barbera Productions to create new characters for Warners. The two that Lovy came up with were Merlin the Magic Mouse and Cool Cat.

History
Merlin was a nightclub magician (he usually preferred to be called a prestidigitator, though he could never pronounce this correctly) who traveled around for work. Much of the humour of the character derived from the fact that, while he was often regarded as a cheap stage magician, he knew some very real and powerful magic tricks. His magic words were typically "Atascadero Escondido!" Merlin also has a sidekick, appropriately named Second Banana, which is a slang term for a magician's assistant.

Daws Butler provided the voice of Merlin and Second Banana in the first short, Merlin the Magic Mouse; Larry Storch performed the voices for the other four films. Merlin's vocal mannerisms are based on that W.C. Fields.

Titles
 Merlin the Magic Mouse (1967)
 Hocus Pocus Powwow (1968)
 Feud with a Dude (1968)
 Fistic Mystic (1969)
 Shamrock and Roll (1969)

References

External links
 
 
 
 
 

Fictional characters who use magic
Fictional mice and rats
Fictional stage magicians
Looney Tunes characters
Film characters introduced in 1967